Civil Wars is an American legal drama that aired on ABC from November 20, 1991, to March 2, 1993. The series was created and executive produced by William M. Finkelstein and produced by Steven Bochco.

Synopsis
The series focused on the lives and cases of New York City divorce attorneys. In the series, two of New York City's top divorce lawyers, Charlie Howell (Peter Onorati) and Sydney Guilford (Mariel Hemingway), form a partnership despite barely knowing each other, following the mental breakdown of Guilford's stressed-out partner, Eli Levinson (Alan Rosenberg). The show had a famously misanthropic opening credits sequence; in it, romantic photo albums were shown as the voice track played couples ripping into each other in court, as each of the show's principal attorneys interrogated them, one by one, on the stand.

Cast
 Mariel Hemingway as Sydney Guilford
 Peter Onorati as Charlie Howell
 Debi Mazar as Denise Iannello
 Alan Rosenberg as Eli Levinson 
 David Marciano as Jeffrey Lassick

Two of the characters lived on longer than the show itself. After Civil Wars was canceled, Eli Levinson (Rosenberg) and Denise Iannello (Mazar) were transplanted to the final season of L.A. Law, despite the fact that L.A. Law aired on NBC and Civil Wars aired on ABC.

Episodes

Season 1 (1991–92)

Season 2 (1992–93)

Awards and nominations

References

External links

1990s American drama television series
1991 American television series debuts
1993 American television series endings
American Broadcasting Company original programming
1990s American legal television series
English-language television shows
Television shows set in New York City
Television series by 20th Century Fox Television